Piscataqua, believed to be an Abenaki word meaning rapid waters, may refer to:

 Piscataqua River, a fast-moving estuarine river dividing coastal New Hampshire and Maine in the United States
 Piscataqua River (Presumpscot River), a tributary of the Presumpscot River in Maine

See also
 Piscataquis County, Maine
 Piscataquis River, a tributary of the Penobscot River in Maine
 Piscataquog River, a tributary of the Merrimack River in New Hampshire
 Piscataway (disambiguation)